Perelà, uomo di fumo (Perelà, man of smoke) is an opera in ten chapters composed by Pascal Dusapin. Dusapin himself wrote the Italian libretto, based on the novel, Il codice Perelà by the Italian Futurist writer, Aldo Palazzeschi. The opera had its world premiere on 24 February 2003 at the Opéra Bastille, conducted by James Conlon.

Roles

Synopsis
The enigmatic protagonist, Perelà, is literally a man made of smoke, formed over thirty-three years in the chimney of a fireplace tended by three old women, Pena, Rete, and Lama. One day he finds the fireplace abandoned. He gives himself a name made up of the first syllable of the names of his "mothers" (Pe-Re-La), puts on a pair of boots that will anchor him to the ground, and sets off for a city that he sees on the horizon. On the way, he is met by an old woman and then by one of King Torlindao's guards who brings him to the royal court. Once there, everyone is fascinated by the strange story of his origin and by his "lightness", which they consider a unique gift. He is admired and feted by all. So much so, that the Queen and the king's minister ask him to devise a new legal code for their society, and a noblewoman who had previously sworn off men, Marchesa Oliva di Bellonda, falls in love with him. But one day, his fortunes change. The old valet, Alloro, sets himself on fire hoping to emulate the lightness of Perelà. The accusations by Alloro's daughter turn the people against Perelà whom they now revile as a murderer. The Marchesa tries to defend him, but he is condemned to prison. After singing a final oration, Perelà escapes by removing his boots and floating out through the chimney of his cell to become a moving form in the sky.

References

Further reading
De Angelis, Giovanna and Giovanardi, Stefano, Storia della narrativa italiana del Novecento, Feltrinelli, 2004. 
Serrou, Bruno, "Entretien – Pascal Dusapin – Perelà, l'homme de fumée", ResMusica, 11 February 2003. 
Stevens, David, "World opera premiere in Paris", International Herald Tribune, 28 February 2003. Accessed via subscription 3 June 2009.  Accessed 3 June 2009.
Tamburri, Anthony Julian, Of saltimbanchi and incendiari: Aldo Palazzeschi and avant-gardism in Italy, Fairleigh Dickinson University Press, 1990.

External links

Compositions by Pascal Dusapin
Operas
Italian-language operas
2003 operas
Operas based on novels